Kvifjorden is a lake in Agder county, Norway. THe lake straddles the borders of the municipalities of Bygland, Kvinesdal, and Sirdal.  The lake was created when a dam was built along the Kvina river.

See also
List of lakes in Aust-Agder
List of lakes in Norway

References

Lakes of Agder
Bygland
Kvinesdal
Sirdal